Outcast Hill is an isolated hill in northern British Columbia, Canada, located southeast of Mess Lake. It lies at the southern end of Mount Edziza Provincial Park.

History
Outcast Hill was named on 2 January 1980 by the Geological Survey of Canada after the Wetalth people, a group of people who lived here in times past, outcast or exiled from the Tahltans.

Geology
Outcast Hill is a volcanic feature associated with the Spectrum Range volcanic complex which in turn form part of the Northern Cordilleran Volcanic Province. It is a cinder cone that formed in the Pleistocene period.

See also
 List of volcanoes in Canada
 List of Northern Cordilleran volcanoes
 Volcanism of Canada
 Volcanism of Western Canada

References

Mount Edziza volcanic complex
Pleistocene volcanoes
Monogenetic volcanoes
Cinder cones of British Columbia
One-thousanders of British Columbia